Potter Creek is a stream in the Unorganized South Part of Nipissing District in Northeastern Ontario, Canada. It is a tributary of Canoe Lake, is in the Lake Huron drainage basin, and lies within Algonquin Provincial Park.

Course
It leaves the lake at the north end, takes in the left tributary Brown Creek, and turns north east, curving southeast through Brûlé Lake to Potter Lake. Canoe Lake flows via the Oxtongue River, the Lake of Bays, the South Branch Muskoka River, the Muskoka River, Lake Muskoka and the Moon River to Georgian Bay on Lake Huron.

References

Rivers of Nipissing District